Dagmar Winter may refer to

 Dagmar Winter (1931–2011), German-British actor Dana Wynter
 Dagmar Winter (bishop) (born 1965), Bishop suffragan of Huntingdon, in the Church of England